Léon Huot (31 December 1898 – 26 May 1961) was a French footballer. He competed in the men's tournament at the 1920 Summer Olympics.

References

External links
 

1898 births
1961 deaths
French footballers
France international footballers
Olympic footballers of France
Footballers at the 1920 Summer Olympics
Footballers at the 1924 Summer Olympics
Sportspeople from Villeneuve-Saint-Georges
Association football defenders
Olympique Alès players
FC Sète 34 players
Footballers from Val-de-Marne